The UK Singles Chart and UK Albums Chart are two of many music charts compiled by the Official Charts Company that calculates the best-selling singles/albums of the week in the United Kingdom. Since 2004 the chart has been based on the sales of both physical singles/albums and digital downloads, with airplay figures excluded from the official chart. A total of 30 singles (1 of which claimed the top spot in 2012) and 35 albums (3 of which claimed the top spot in 2012) claimed the top spot in 2013.

Every song which reached number one between 27 April and 13 July sold over 100,000 copies during its first week of sales although it failed to break a record which was previously held in 1997 where the number one single would sell 100,000 copies or more in its first week of sales every week from 28 June 1997 through to 3 January 1998.

Album sales, however, were at an all-time low with only 93,200,000 albums sold. It was also the first time since 1984 where an artist album failed to sell over a million copies by the end of the year.

Following the release of David Bowie's comeback single "Where Are We Now", singles became eligible to chart, before the release of its parent album.

In the singles chart, James Arthur returned to the top of the charts, having reached number one in 2012 with "Impossible". Bingo Players, Macklemore & Ryan Lewis, Avicii, Nicky Romero, The Saturdays, PJ & Duncan, Duke Dumont, Daft Punk, Naughty Boy, Robin Thicke, Icona Pop, John Newman, Miley Cyrus, Ellie Goulding, OneRepublic, Lorde, Storm Queen, Martin Garrix, Alesso and Sam Bailey have all claimed their first number 1 single as a lead artist.

In the albums chart, Emeli Sandé, Calvin Harris and Mumford & Sons returned to the top of the charts, having reached number one in 2012 with Our Version of Events, 18 Months and Babel. Biffy Clyro, Bastille, Rudimental, Caro Emerald, Daft Punk, Disclosure, Tom Odell, JAY Z, Robin Thicke, Jahméne Douglas, Richard & Adam, Avenged Sevenfold, The 1975, Haim, Miley Cyrus and John Newman have all claimed their first number 1 album.

Emeli Sandé continued her chart success in the albums chart when her album Our Version of Events, which was the biggest selling album in 2012 was also the biggest selling album in 2013 throughout its entirety until it was surpassed during the final week of 2013 by One Direction's third album Midnight Memories, which ended the year as 2013's biggest selling album, pushing Sandé into second place.

"Blurred Lines" by Robin Thicke featuring T.I. & Pharrell Williams has spent the most weeks at number one in the singles with five and Les Misérables by Les Misérables, Our Version of Events by Emeli Sandé and The Impossible Dream by Richard & Adam have all spent the most weeks at number one in the albums with four.

Chart achievements
X Factor 2013 winner Sam Bailey scored the Christmas number-one single of 2013. The single sold 148,853 copies in its first week to become the lowest-selling Christmas number one since Robbie Williams & Nicole Kidman scored Christmas number 1 in 2001 when "Somethin' Stupid" sold 110,000 copies in the Christmas week and also, the second lowest-selling X Factor winner's single.

Number ones

Number-one singles

Number-one albums

Number-one single downloads 
{| class="wikitable" style="font-size:97%; text-align:center;"
|-
! Chart date(week ending) !! Song !! Artist(s) !! References
|-
| 5 January || "Impossible" || James Arthur || 
|-
| 12 January || rowspan="3"|"Scream & Shout" || rowspan="3"|will.i.am featuring Britney Spears || 
|-
| 19 January || 
|-
| 26 January || 
|-
| 2 February || rowspan="2"|"Get Up (Rattle)" || rowspan="2"|Bingo Players featuring Far East Movement || 
|-
| 9 February  || 
|-
| 16 February || "Thrift Shop" || Macklemore & Ryan Lewis featuring Wanz || 
|-
| 23 February || "I Could Be the One" || Avicii vs Nicky Romero || 
|-
| 2 March || "One Way or Another (Teenage Kicks)" || One Direction || 
|-
| 9 March || rowspan="3"|"Mirrors" || rowspan="3"|Justin Timberlake || 
|-
| 16 March || 
|-
| 23 March || 
|-
| 30 March || "What About Us" || The Saturdays featuring Sean Paul || 
|-
| 6 April || "Let's Get Ready to Rhumble" || PJ & Duncan || 
|-
| 13 April || rowspan="2"|"Need U (100%)" || rowspan="2"|Duke Dumont featuring A*M*E || 
|-
| 20 April || 
|-
| 27 April || "Waiting All Night" || Rudimental featuring Ella Eyre || 
|-
| 4 May || rowspan="4"|"Get Lucky" || rowspan="4"|Daft Punk featuring Pharrell Williams & Nile Rodgers || 
|-
| 11 May || 
|-
| 18 May || 
|-
| 25 May || 
|-
| 1 June || "La La La" || Naughty Boy featuring Sam Smith || 
|-
| 8 June || rowspan="4"|"Blurred Lines" || rowspan="4"|Robin Thicke featuring T.I. & Pharrell Williams || 
|-
| 15 June || 
|-
| 22 June || 
|-
| 29 June || 
|-
| 6 July || "I Love It" || Icona Pop featuring Charli XCX || 
|-
| 13 July || "Love Me Again" || John Newman || 
|-
| 20 July || "Blurred Lines" || Robin Thicke featuring T.I. & Pharrell Williams || 
|-
| 27 July || rowspan="3"|"Wake Me Up" || rowspan="3"|Avicii featuring Aloe Blacc || 
|-
| 3 August || 
|-
| 10 August || 
|-
| 17 August || "We Can't Stop" || Miley Cyrus || 
|-
| 24 August || rowspan="3"|"Burn" || rowspan="3"|Ellie Goulding || 
|-
| 31 August || 
|-
| 7 September || 
|-
| 14 September || rowspan="2"|"Roar" || rowspan="2"|Katy Perry || 
|-
| 21 September || 
|-
| 28 September || rowspan="2"|"Talk Dirty" || rowspan="2"|Jason Derulo featuring 2 Chainz || 
|-
| 5 October || 
|-
| 12 October || "Counting Stars" || OneRepublic || 
|-
| 19 October || "Wrecking Ball" || Miley Cyrus || 
|-
| 26 October || "Counting Stars" || OneRepublic || 
|-
| 2 November || "Royals" || Lorde || 
|-
| 9 November || "The Monster" || Eminem featuring Rihanna || 
|-
| 16 November || "Look Right Through" || Storm Queen || 
|-
| 23 November || "Animals" || Martin Garrix || 
|-
| 30 November || "Of The Night" || Bastille || 
|-
| 7 December || "Under Control" || Calvin Harris & Alesso featuring Hurts || 
|-
| 14 December || "Story Of My Life" || One Direction || 
|-
| 21 December || "Hey Brother" || Avicii || 
|-
| 28 December || "Skyscraper" || Sam Bailey || 
|}

Number-one album downloads 
{| class="wikitable" style="font-size:97%; text-align:center;"
|-
! Chart date(week ending) !! Album !! Artist !! References
|-
| 5 January || rowspan="2"|Now 83 || rowspan="2"|Various Artists || 
|-
| 12 January || 
|-
| 19 January || 18 Months || Calvin Harris || 
|-
| 26 January || rowspan="2"|Les Misérables || rowspan="2"|Les Misérables || 
|-
| 2 February || 
|-
| 9 February || Opposites || Biffy Clyro || 
|-
| 16 February || Jake Bugg || Jake Bugg || 
|-
| 23 February || Holy Fire || Foals || 
|-
| 2 March || Babel || Mumford & Sons || 
|-
| 9 March || Our Version of Events || Emeli Sandé || 
|-
| 16 March || Bad Blood || Bastille || 
|-
| 23 March || The Next Day || David Bowie || 
|-
| 30 March || The 20/20 Experience || Justin Timberlake || 
|-
| 6 April || rowspan="2"|Now 84 || rowspan="2"|Various Artists || 
|-
| 13 April || 
|-
| 20 April || Paramore || Paramore || 
|-
| 27 April || To Be Loved || Michael Bublé || 
|-
| 4 May || Tape Deck Heart || Frank Turner || 
|-
| 11 May || rowspan="2"|Home || rowspan="2"|Rudimental || 
|-
| 18 May || 
|-
| 25 May || English Rain || Gabrielle Aplin || 
|-
| 1 June || rowspan="2"|Random Access Memories || rowspan="2"|Daft Punk || 
|-
| 8 June || 
|-
| 15 June || rowspan="2"|Settle || rowspan="2"|Disclosure || 
|-
| 22 June || 
|-
| 29 June || Yeezus || Kanye West || 
|-
| 6 July || Long Way Down || Tom Odell || 
|-
| 13 July || Babel || Mumford & Sons || 
|-
| 20 July || rowspan="2"|Magna Carta... Holy Grail || rowspan="2"|JAY Z || 
|-
| 27 July || 
|-
| 3 August || rowspan="4"|Now 85 || rowspan="6"|Various Artists || 
|-
| 10 August || 
|-
| 17 August || 
|-
| 24 August || 
|-
| 31 August || rowspan="2"|Teenage Dirtbags || 
|-
| 7 September || 
|-
| 14 September || The 1975 || The 1975 || 
|-
| 21 September || rowspan="2"|AM || rowspan="2"|Arctic Monkeys || 
|-
| 28 September || 
|-
| 5 October || Nothing Was the Same || Drake || 
|-
| 12 October || The 20/20 Experience – 2 of 2 || Justin Timberlake || 
|-
| 19 October || Bangerz || Miley Cyrus || 
|-
| 26 October || Tribute || John Newman || 
|-
| 2 November || Prism || Katy Perry || 
|-
| 9 November || Reflektor || Arcade Fire || 
|-
| 16 November || The Marshall Mathers LP 2 || Eminem || 
|-
| 23 November || Artpop || Lady Gaga || 
|-
| 30 November || Now 86 || Various Artists || 
|-
| 7 December || Midnight Memories || One Direction || 
|-
| 14 December || Now Christmas || Various Artists || 
|-
| 21 December || rowspan="2"|Beyoncé || rowspan="2"|Beyoncé || 
|-
| 28 December || 
|}

Number-one compilation albums

Year-end charts

Best-selling singles

Best-selling artist albums

Notes:

Best-selling compilation albums

See also 
 2013 in British music
 List of 2013 albums
 List of UK top 10 singles in 2013

References 

Charts
United Kingdom
British record charts